Koyunlu is a small town in Niğde Province, Turkey.

Its population was 1422  Its elevation is 

The town was founded 600 years ago. The former name of the town was Adırmusun. According to legend the name of the town refers to a certain Adil who founded the town.

Main economic activities are agriculture and animal husbandry. (In fact the current name of the town refers to sheep) Previously Koyunlu produced hand-woven carpets. In 1972, the  Koyunlu carpet factory was founded by Birko, which was owned by Koyunlu people in 1972.

References

Populated places in Niğde Province
Towns in Turkey